Red Ventures is an American media company, which owns and operates brands such as Lonely Planet, CNET, ZDNet, The Points Guy, Healthline and Bankrate. Red Ventures focuses on sites that dispense news, advice, and reviews. The company's corporate headquarters is located in Indian Land, South Carolina, a suburb of Charlotte, North Carolina.

History 
Red Ventures was formed on September 29, 1999, in Fort Mill, South Carolina by Ric Elias and Dan Feldstein. Before its 2020 acquisitions, the company has grown into an international presence with more than 100 brands, 3,000 employees, and operations in the United Kingdom and Brazil.

In 2015, the company got a $250 million investment from Silver Lake. That same year, it doubled the size of its headquarters and bought postal services company Imagitas from Pitney Bowes.

Red Ventures acquired Bankrate Inc. for $1.24 billion in cash in a deal announced July 3, 2017.

On September 14, 2020, Red Ventures agreed to purchase the CNET Media Group from ViacomCBS for $500 million. On December 1, 2020, Red Ventures bought Lonely Planet from Tennessee-based NC2 Media.

In 2021, the company had 4,500 employees and 751 million readers per month.

Business model
In 2023 The Verge described the business model of the company as "publish[ing] content designed to rank highly in Google search for “high-intent” queries and ... monet[izing] that traffic with lucrative affiliate links.", with a particular focus on financial content such as credit cards. The characterization came after the website Futurism found several articles published by Red Ventures properties, including CNET, were quietly written by artificial intelligence software, with the stories containing numerous inaccuracies and instances of plagiarism. Red Ventures announced layoffs at CNET a few weeks after the reports from The Verge and Futurism, which the company says were unrelated.

Futurism additionally highlighted undisclosed AI-generated, SEO-focused content produced by Red Ventures's education division (internally RV EDU). This content promotes schools with which Red Ventures maintains affiliate agreements, such as University of Phoenix (a for-profit college owned by Apollo Global Management) and Liberty University (founded by conservative activist and Baptist pastor Jerry Falwell). Websites operated by RV EDU include BestColleges.com, TheBestSchools.org, NurseJournal.org, ComputerScience.org, and Psychology.org, "as well as numerous sites with domain names that imply they're nonprofits".

Timeline 

 1999: Red F, the precursor to Red Ventures, was founded.
 2003: Red Ventures is launched, beginning with DIRECTV (DirectstarTV brand). 
 2008: Red Ventures acquires Modern Consumer
 2010: General Atlantic announces investment in Red Ventures, and Managing Director Anton Levy joins the board of directors.
 2012: Red Ventures acquires www.homeinsurance.com and with it a satellite office in Wilmington, North Carolina.
 2015: Silver Lake announces $250M strategic investment in Red Ventures.
 2015: May - Red Ventures acquires Imagitas (now MyMove) from Pitney Bowes for $310M.
 2016: Red Ventures acquires Soda.com
 2017: Red Ventures acquires Choose Energy
 2017: Red Ventures acquires Allconnect
 2017: Red Ventures acquires Bankrate, Inc. (including The Points Guy) 
 2019: Red Ventures acquires HigherEducation.com
 2019: Red Ventures acquires Healthline
 2020: Acquisition of CNET Media Group (including Chowhound) from ViacomCBS for $500 million.
 2020: Acquisition of Lonely Planet from NC2 Media for an undisclosed amount.
2021: Acquisition of Healthgrades.com from Mercury Healthcare for an undisclosed amount.
2022: Closure of Chowhound.
2022: Red Ventures partners with UnitedHealth Group's Optum Health to launch RVO Health.
2022: Fandom, Inc. acquired the sites GameSpot, Metacritic, TV Guide, GameFAQs, Giant Bomb, Cord Cutters News and Comic Vine from Red Ventures.

References

External links 
 

 
American companies established in 2000
Privately held companies based in South Carolina
Marketing companies established in 2000
Marketing companies of the United States
Mass media companies established in 2000
Mass media companies of the United States
Companies based in Charlotte, North Carolina
Silver Lake (investment firm) companies
Lancaster County, South Carolina